The United States Navy lists two warships named USS Skill -

 , a metal-hulled fleet minesweeper placed in service on 17 November 1942.
 , a wooden-hulled fleet minesweeper commissioned on 7 November 1955.

United States Navy ship names